Kryovrisi may refer to several places in Greece:

Kryovrysi, Elis, a village in the Elis regional unit
Kryovrysi, Ioannina, a village in the Ioannina regional unit
Kryovrysi, Kozani, a village in the Kozani regional unit
Kryovrysi, Larissa, a village in the Larissa regional unit
Kryovrysi, Laconia, a village in the Laconia regional unit
Kryovrysi, Thesprotia, a village in the Thesprotia regional unit